Elasmognatha is a taxonomic grouping, a clade, of air-breathing land snails and slugs, terrestrial pulmonate gastropod molluscs.

A number of species in this taxonomic group are endangered.

Taxonomy
In the taxonomy of the Gastropoda by Bouchet & Rocroi, 2005, Elasmognatha is treated as a clade within the larger clade Stylommatophora.

The following two superfamilies and families have been recognized in the taxonomy of Bouchet & Rocroi (2005):
superfamily Succineoidea
family Succineidae
superfamily Athoracophoroidea
family Athoracophoridae

References

Stylommatophora